The 2014 USTA Tennis Classic of Macon was a professional tennis tournament played on outdoor hard courts. It was the second edition of the tournament which was part of the 2014 ITF Women's Circuit, offering a total of $50,000 in prize money. It took place in Macon, Georgia, United States, on October 20–26, 2014.

Singles main draw entrants

Seeds 

 1 Rankings as of October 13, 2014

Other entrants 
The following players received wildcards into the singles main draw:
  Lauren Embree
  Ellie Halbauer
  Katerina Stewart

The following players received entry from the qualifying draw:
  Kateryna Bondarenko
  Beatriz Haddad Maia
  Jasmine Paolini
  Petra Rampre

The following players received entry by a protected ranking:
  Edina Gallovits-Hall

Champions

Singles 

  Kateryna Bondarenko def.  Grace Min 6–4, 7–5

Doubles 

  Madison Brengle /  Alexa Glatch def.  Anna Tatishvili /  Ashley Weinhold 6–0, 7–5

External links 
 2014 USTA Tennis Classic of Macon at ITFtennis.com
 Official website

2014 ITF Women's Circuit
Hard court tennis tournaments
Women's tennis tournaments in the United States
2014 in American tennis
Tennis tournaments in Georgia (U.S. state)
2014 in sports in Georgia (U.S. state)
October 2014 sports events in the United States